José Manuel Marfán Lewis (born 26 December 1952) is a Chilean politician and economist who served as vicepresident of the Central Bank of Chile. Similarly, he served as Minister of Finance.

References

External links
 Profile at Chile's Minister of Finance

1952 births
University of Chile alumni
Yale University alumni
20th-century Chilean politicians
21st-century Chilean politicians
Socialist Party of Chile politicians
Living people